Paimbœuf is a commune in the Loire-Atlantique department in western France, lying on the south bank of the river Loire upriver from Saint-Nazaire but considerably downriver from Nantes.

In the Napoleonic era it was the site of considerable naval shipbuilding. The United States Navy established a naval air station there on 1 March 1918 to operate dirigibles during World War I. The base closed shortly after the First Armistice at Compiègne.

Population

See also
Communes of the Loire-Atlantique department

References

Communes of Loire-Atlantique